The Hawaiian diaspora or Native Hawaiian diaspora (Hawaiian: Kānaka maoli i nā ʻāina ʻē) are people of full or partial Hawaiian descent living outside of Hawaii. The vast majority of them live in the contiguous United States, though smaller communities are present elsewhere.

History

Canada 
Between the 18th and 19th centuries, thousands of Native Hawaiians were recruited by North American labor companies, many of which were in British Columbia, Canada's westernmost province. Common occupations among Hawaiian migrants included fur trapping and sailing. These laborers were referred to as kanakas, a term derived from the Hawaiian word "kanaka" (human).

Canada's first wave of Hawaiian workers arrived in 1811, with a total of 24 laborers on board. In subsequent years, further immigration continued from the Hawaiian Islands. Initially, most Hawaiians worked in the fur industry. Later on, many of them worked in other fields such as blacksmithing and carpentry.

Hawaiian laborers were highly sought after due to their skilled qualities. In 1829, the Hudson's Bay Company opened up an agency in Honolulu to hire more contract workers. By the year 1844, between 200 and 300 Hawaiians were employed by the HBC, with an additional 50 working as sailors.

United States 
Similar to Canada, the United States also received an influx of Hawaiian laborers on its west coast, with continued immigration due to events such as the California Gold Rush.

In recent decades, thousands of Hawaiians have moved to the US mainland, with the primary factor being Hawaii’s struggling economy. As a result of this exodus, nearly 50% of all Native Hawaiians live outside of Hawaii. California hosts the largest Hawaiian diaspora community, followed by Washington state and Nevada. Due to a notable Hawaiian presence in Las Vegas, the city is sometimes referred to as the “ninth island” by Hawaii residents.

See also 

 Native Hawaiians
 Hawaii
 Diaspora

References 

Native Hawaiian people
Oceanian diaspora
Hawaiian emigrants
History of Hawaii